Carlos Eduardo Soares Mota, commonly known as Seco is a Brazilian footballer who plays as a goalkeeper for Santo André.

Club career
He made his national league debut for Brasil de Pelotas as a substitute for the injured Marcelo Pitol, against Paysandu in the 35 round of 2017 Campeonato Brasileiro Série B on 11 November 2017. He became first choice goalkeeper when Marcelo left the club at the end of 2018.

References

External links
 

Living people
1992 births
Brazilian footballers
Association football goalkeepers
Concórdia Atlético Clube players
Sociedade Esportiva Recreativa e Cultural Brasil players
Grêmio Esportivo Brasil players
Campeonato Brasileiro Série B players
Footballers from Porto Alegre